Zara is a 1736 tragedy by the British writer Aaron Hill, based on the 1732 French play Zaïre by Voltaire.

The original Drury Lane cast included Susannah Maria Cibber as Zara, William Milward as Lusignan, Theophilus Cibber as Nerestan, Edward Berry as Chatillon, Richard Cross as Melidor and Hannah Pritchard as Selima. The incidental music was composed by Thomas Arne.

References

Bibliography
 Burling, William J. A Checklist of New Plays and Entertainments on the London Stage, 1700-1737. Fairleigh Dickinson Univ Press, 1992.
 Gerrard, Christine. Aaron Hill: The Muses' Projector, 1685-1750. Oxford University Press, 2003.
 Nicoll, Allardyce. A History of Early Eighteenth Century Drama: 1700-1750. CUP Archive, 1927.

1736 plays
West End plays
Tragedy plays
Plays by Aaron Hill